Live at the Apollo is an album by Daryl Hall & John Oates released in September 1985, recorded live at the Apollo Theater in New York. It is subtitled "With David Ruffin & Eddie Kendricks", of The Temptations-fame.  The album is a mixture of their classics and some then-current songs by Hall & Oates.  A VHS video of this concert with a different running order was released in 1987.

On July 13, 1985, Daryl Hall, John Oates, Eddie Kendricks and David Ruffin appeared together at Live Aid, two months before this album was released.

Track listing

On some releases, the "Apollo Medley" is separated into individual tracks.

Personnel 
 Daryl Hall – vocals, keyboards, guitars, mando-guitar
 John Oates – vocals, guitars 
 Eddie Kendricks – vocals
 David Ruffin – vocals
 Charlie DeChant – keyboards, saxophone, backing vocals
 Wells Christy – keyboards, Synclavier
 Robbie Kilgore – keyboards
 Michael Klvana – keyboards
 G.E. Smith – lead guitars 
 Tom "T-Bone" Wolk – bass guitar, backing vocals
 Mickey Curry – drums
 Jimmy Maelen – percussion
 Steve Elson – baritone saxophone
 Lenny Pickett – tenor saxophone, brass leader 
 Ray Anderson – trombone
 Mac Gollehon – trumpet
 "Hollywood" Paul Litteral – trumpet

Production 
 Daryl Hall – producer 
 John Oates – producer 
 Bob Clearmountain – producer, recording, mixing 
 David Hewitt – recording 
 Bob Ludwig – mastering at Masterdisk (New York, NY)
 Mick Haggerty – album artwork, design 
 Lynn Goldsmith – inner sleeve photography 
 Nina Krieger – inner sleeve photography 
 Tommy Mottolla and Champion Entertainment Organization, Inc. – management

Charts

Singles

References

Hall & Oates live albums
1985 live albums
RCA Records live albums
Albums recorded at the Apollo Theater